Wawona may refer to:
 Wawona (schooner), a historic schooner in Seattle, Washington, USA, now disassembled
 Wawona, California, an unincorporated town within Yosemite National Park, USA
 Wawona Hotel, in Yosemite National Park
 Wawona Tree, a giant sequoia in Yosemite National Park
 Camp Wawona, a summer camp in Yosemite National Park
 Wawona Clubhouse, home of Project Insight in Sigmund Stern Recreation Grove, San Francisco, California

See also
 North Wawona, California
 South Wawona, California